Kogel may refer to:

People
 Benedikt Kögl (1891-1969), German painter
 Debbie Koegel (born 1977), American ice dancer
 Karl Kögel (born 1917), German ice hockey player
 Leon de Kogel (born 1991), Dutch football player and coach
 Mike Kogel, lead singer of Los Bravos
 Max Koegel (1895-1946), Nazi officer
 Pierre Kogel (born 1887), Belgian football player and coach
 Rebekka de Kogel-Kadijk (born 1979), Dutch volleyball player

Places
 Kogel, Mecklenburg-Vorpommern, Germany
 Kogel Say, Afghanistan
 Roter Kogel, mountain in Austria
 Weißer Kogel, mountain in Austria

Other
 Kogel Bearings, bicycle manufacturer
 Kogel mogel, dessert
 Kögel Trailer, vehicle manufacturer